Ostatnia misja ("The Last Mission") is a Polish film directed by Wojciech Wójcik. It was filmed in 1999, from 6 January to 1 March.

The band O.N.A. created the music for the film.

Cast 

 Peter J. Lucas – Andrzej Kostynowicz
 Janusz Gajos - police officer Piotr Sobczak
 Ewa Gorzelak - Monika Górska
 Piotr Fronczewski - Józef Muran
 Mirosław Baka - Bruno Wiśniewski, Muran's man
 Artur Żmijewski - Krzysztof Myszkowski
 Piotr Rzymyszkiewicz - agent
 Tomasz Białkowski - Colonel Tremiere
 Paweł Wilczak - aspirant Kowal, Sobczak's man
 Joachim Lamża - David, an FBI agent resident in Poland
 Wojciech Kalarus - police officer I
 Jan Kozaczuk - police officer II
 Bartłomiej Świderski - police officer III
 Mirosław Zbrojewicz - Sztych
 Sławomir Orzechowski - Rekord
 Sebastian Nietupski - Makumba, Bruno's man
 Zbigniew Dziduch - Rekord's guard
 Krzysztof Szczerbiński - drug dealer
 Antoni Wilkoński - Mateusz, Sobczak's grandson
 Zuzanna Wojtal - Ewa, Sobczak's grandson
 Małgorzata Foremniak - Sobczak's daughter
 Maria Pakulnis - Dr Sawicka
 Sybilla Rostek - Kałużyńska's secretary
 Borys Jaźnicki - Muran's secretary
 Jacek Braciak - courier company worker
 Jerzy Kamas - Stefan Dębowski
 Lech Łotocki - police specialist I
 Igor Sawin - police specialist 
 Krzysztof Kalczyński - president of Biznes Klub
 Zbigniew Geiger - Farina
 Sławomir Tomczak - man on the street
 Danuta Stenka - Kałużyńska
 Andrzej Piszczatowski - Prefekt
 Marek Barbasiewicz - Paweł Górski, Monika's stepfather
 Andrzej Żółkiewski - police officer in hotel reception I
 Wojciech Majchrzak - police officer in hotel reception II
 Grzegorz Miśtal - receptionist in hotel
 Michał Grudziński - Kostynowicz's doctor
 Maciej Kozłowski - Cortez
 Janusz Nowicki - General Winkler

External links 

 Ostatnia misja at filmweb.pl
 Ostatnia misja at imdb.com
 Ostatnia misja at filmpolski.pl
 Ostatnia misja at stopklatka.pl

Polish drama films